

Events

January–March
 January 3 – Reassertion of British sovereignty over the Falkland Islands in the South Atlantic.
 February 6 – His Royal Highness Prince Otto Friedrich Ludwig of Bavaria assumes the title His Majesty Othon the First, by the Grace of God, King of Greece, Prince of Bavaria.
 February 16 – The United States Supreme Court hands down its landmark decision of Barron v. Mayor and City Council of Baltimore.
 March 4 – Andrew Jackson is sworn in for his second term as President of the United States.

April–June
 April 1 – General Antonio López de Santa Anna is elected President of Mexico by the legislatures of 16 of the 18 Mexican states. During his frequent absences from office to fight on the battlefield, Santa Anna turns the duties of government over to his vice president, Valentín Gómez Farías.
 April 18 – Over 300 delegates from England, Scotland, Wales and Ireland travel to the office of the Prime Minister, the Earl Grey, to call for the immediate abolition of slavery throughout the British Empire.
 May 6
 Carl Friedrich Gauss and Wilhelm Weber obtain permission to build an electromagnetic telegraph in Göttingen.
 The Ottoman Empire promulgates a firman ratifying the Peace Agreement of Kütahya, bringing an end to the Egyptian-Ottoman War.
 In Alexandria, Virginia, an attack is made on U.S. President Andrew Jackson.
 May 10 – The Le Van Khoi revolt breaks out in southern Vietnam against Emperor Minh Mang, who has desecrated the deceased mandarin Le Van Duyet.
 May 11 – British brig Lady of the Lake, on passage from Ireland to Quebec, is struck by ice and sunk off Cape St. Francis (Newfoundland) with the loss of between 170 and 265 lives and only 15 survivors.
 May 25 – The Chilean Constitution of 1833 is promulgated.
 June 5 – Ada Lovelace is introduced to Charles Babbage by Mary Somerville.
 June 9 – Dubai gets independence from the United Kingdom and is founded as a city.
 June 29 – An earthquake at Fort Nisqually is experienced by William Fraser Tolmie; his journal entry records the first written eyewitness account of an earthquake in the Puget Sound region.

July–September
 July 5 – Liberal Wars: Battle of Cape St. Vincent – The forces of Queen Maria II of Portugal win decisively.
 July 8 – The Treaty of Hünkâr İskelesi creates an alliance between the Ottoman Empire and the Russian Empire.
 July 14 – John Keble preaches a sermon at Oxford (in part a protest against the Church Temporalities (Ireland) Act 1833), which is afterwards published as National Apostasy; this sermon is traditionally considered as the beginning of the Oxford Movement of High Church Anglicans.
 July 20 – A mob in Jackson County, Missouri, destroys the printing office of the early Church of Jesus Christ of Latter-day Saints containing what becomes known as The Doctrine and Covenants.
 August 1 – King William's College on the Isle of Man officially opens.
 August 12 – The settlement of Chicago is established by 350 settlers at the estuary of the Chicago River in the Illinois Territory, USA.
 August 18 – The Canadian ship  sets out from Pictou, Nova Scotia on a 25-day passage of the Atlantic Ocean (largely under steam) to Gravesend, England.
 August 20 – Future United States President Benjamin Harrison is born in Ohio. From this date until the death of Former U.S. President James Madison on June 28 1836, a total of 18 Presidents of the United States (2 former, 1 current, and 15 future) are living; which is more than any other time period in U.S. history.
 August 26 – The Canton of Basel is partitioned by the Swiss Tagsatzung to create the two half-cantons of Basel-City and Basel-Country.
 August 28 – The British Slavery Abolition Act 1833, beginning the process of giving slaves in much of the British Empire their freedom, receives royal assent (coming into effect August 1, 1834). A £20 million fund is established to compensate slaveowners.
 August 29 – The Parliament of the United Kingdom enacts the Factory Acts, limiting child labour.
 August 31 – Chartered ship Amphitrite sinks off Boulogne-sur-Mer while undertaking the penal transportation of 108 British female convicts and 12 children from Woolwich to New South Wales with the loss of 133 lives; only 3 crew survive.
 September 2 – Oberlin College is founded in Oberlin, Ohio.
 September 6 – An 8.0 earthquake shakes the Chinese province of Yunnan destroying buildings, homes and temples killing 6,000 people.
 September 29 – Three-year-old Isabella II becomes Queen of Spain, under the regency of her mother, Maria Christina of the Two Sicilies. Her uncle Don Carlos, Conde de Molina challenges her claim, beginning the First Carlist War.

October–December
 October 20 – Alfred, Lord Tennyson, writes his oft-quoted poem, Ulysses.
 November 12–13 – A very spectacular occurrence of the Leonid meteor shower is observed all over North America, and is the inspiration for the song "Stars Fell on Alabama".
 November 25 – A major 8.7 earthquake strikes Sumatra.
 December – The American Anti-Slavery Society is founded.
 December 14 – Kaspar Hauser, a mysterious German youth, is stabbed, dying three days later on December 17.
 December 18 – The national anthem of the Russian Empire, God Save the Tsar!, is first performed.

Date unknown
 The dawn of biochemistry: The first enzyme, diastase, is discovered by Anselme Payen.
 Greece recaptures the Acropolis of Athens.
 H.R.H. Prince Mongkut of Siam founds the Dhammayut Buddhist reform movement.
 American healthcare brand McKesson Corporation established as a partnership.
 Foundation of:
 Kalamazoo College in Kalamazoo, Michigan.
 Madras College in St Andrews, Scotland.

Births

January–June

 January 1 – Robert Lawson, New Zealand architect (d. 1902)
 January 5 – Eugene W. Hilgard, German-American "Father of soil science" (d. 1916)
 January 7 – Sir Henry Roscoe, English chemist (d. 1915)
 January 18 – Joseph S. Skerrett, American admiral (d. 1897)
 January 28 – Charles George Gordon, British army officer, administrator (d. 1885)
 February 3 – Abu Bakar of Johor, Malaysian sultan (d. 1895)
 February 6 – J. E. B. Stuart, American Confederate general (d. 1864)
 February 11 – Melville Fuller, 8th Chief Justice of the United States Supreme Court (d. 1910)
 February 19 – Élie Ducommun, Swiss journalist, activist, recipient of the Nobel Peace Prize (d. 1906)
 February 25 – John St. John, American temperance movement leader (d. 1916)
 February 28 – Alfred von Schlieffen, German field marshal (d. 1913)
 March 10 – Dimitrie Sturdza, 4-time prime minister of Romania (d. 1914)
 March 14 – Lucy Hobbs Taylor, American dentist (d. 1910)
 March 15 – Géza Fejérváry, 16th Prime Minister of Hungary (d. 1914)
 March 20 – Daniel Dunglas Home, Scottish medium (d. 1886)
 March 22 – Manuel Ruiz Zorrilla, Prime Minister of Spain (d. 1895)
 April 6 – Luis Cordero Crespo, 14th President of Ecuador (d. 1912)
 April 11 – Fredrik von Otter, 8th Prime Minister of Sweden (d. 1910)
 May 5 – Lazarus Fuchs, German mathematician (d. 1902)
 May 7 – Johannes Brahms, German composer (d. 1897)
 May 9 – Hermann von Spaun, Austro-Hungarian admiral (d. 1919)
 May 26 – Edward William Godwin, English architect (d. 1886)
 June 1 – John Marshall Harlan, Associate Justice of the Supreme Court of the United States (d. 1911)
 June 4 – Garnet Wolseley, 1st Viscount Wolseley, British field marshal (d. 1913)
 June 24
 Gustaf Åkerhielm, 6th Prime Minister of Sweden (d. 1900)
 Alfred William Bennett, English botanist (d. 1902)

July–December

 July 14 – Alfred Biliotti, Italian Levantine British consular officer and archaeologist (d. 1915)
 July 26 – Gheorghe Manu, 17th Prime Minister of Romania (d. 1911)
 July 27 – Thomas George Bonney, English geologist (d. 1923)
 August 3 – Auguste Schmidt, German educator, women's rights activist (d. 1902)
 August 9 – Emily Pepys, English child diarist (d. 1877)
 August 16 – Eliza Ann Otis, American poet, newspaper publisher and philanthropist (d. 1904)
 August 20 – Benjamin Harrison, 23rd President of the United States (d. 1901)
 September 2 – Henry Hotze, Swiss American Confederate propagandist (d. 1887)
 September 20 – Ernesto Teodoro Moneta, Italian pacifist, recipient of the Nobel Peace Prize (d. 1918)
 September 22 – Gheorghe Grigore Cantacuzino, twice Prime Minister of Romania (d. 1913)
 October 2 – William Corby, American Catholic priest (d. 1897)
 October 20 – Mary F. Eastman, American educator, lecturer, writer and suffragist (d. 1908)
 October 21 – Alfred Nobel, Swedish inventor of dynamite, creator of the Nobel Prize (d. 1896)
 October 23 – Antonio Flores Jijón, 13th President of Ecuador (d. 1915)
 November 6 – Jonas Lie, Norwegian author (d. 1908)
 November 9 – Émile Gaboriau, French writer (d. 1873)
 November 12 – Alexander Borodin, Russian composer (d. 1887)
 November 13 – Edwin Booth, American tragedian (d. 1893)
 November 14 – Sir Hugh Gough, British general, Victoria Cross recipient (d. 1909)
 November 19 – Eliza Lynch, First Lady of Paraguay (d. 1886)
 November 27 – Princess Mary Adelaide of Cambridge (d. 1897)
 November 30 – Frederick Richards British admiral (d. 1912)
 December 7 – Rodrigo Augusto da Silva, Brazilian Senator, author of the Golden Law (d. 1889)
 December 13 – Petre S. Aurelian, 19th Prime Minister of Romania (d. 1909)
 December 20 – Samuel Mudd, American doctor to John Wilkes Booth (d. 1883)
 December 25 – Princess Adelheid-Marie of Anhalt-Dessau (d. 1916)

Date unknown
 Margaret Fox, American medium (d. 1893)
 Fu Shanxiang, Chinese scholar, Chancellor (d. 1864)

Deaths

January–June

 January 10 – Adrien-Marie Legendre, French mathematician (b. 1752)
 January 16 –Nannette Streicher, German piano maker, composer, music educator, and writer (b. 1769)
 January 16 – Banastre Tarleton, British general, politician (b. 1754)
 January 23 – Edward Pellew, 1st Viscount Exmouth, British admiral (b. 1757)
 March 13 – William Bradley, British naval officer, cartographer (b. 1757)
 April 6 – Adamantios Korais, Greek scholar (b. 1748)
 April 7
 Antoni Radziwiłł, Polish politician (b. 1775)
 Jacques Réattu, French artist (b. 1760)
 April 22 – Richard Trevithick, English inventor (b. 1771)
 May 5 – Sophia Campbell, Australian artist (b. 1777)
 May 15 – Edmund Kean, British actor (b. 1787)
 May 23 – Francesca Anna Canfield, American linguist, poet, and translator (b. 1803)
 June 1 – Oliver Wolcott Jr., American lawyer, politician, 2nd United States Secretary of the Treasury, 24th Governor of Connecticut (b. 1760)
 June 2 – Simon Byrne, Irish prizefighter (b. 1806)

July–December

 July 2 – Gervasio Antonio de Posadas, Argentine leader (b. 1757)
 July 5 – Nicéphore Niépce, French photography pioneer (b. 1765)
 July 11 – Yagan, Noongar indigenous Australian warrior (killed) (b. c. 1795)
 July 12 – Samuel Sterett, American politician (b. 1758)
 July 19 – George Leveson-Gower, 1st Duke of Sutherland, British landowner (b. 1758)
 July 20 – Ninian Edwards, American politician, Governor of and Senator from Illinois (b. 1775)
 July 22 – Joseph Forlenze, Italian ophthalmologist (b. 1757)
 July 23 – Anselmo de la Cruz, Chilean political figure (b. 1777)
 July 26 – Thomas Knapton, English mariner, executed (b. c. 1816)
 July 29 – William Wilberforce, English politician, abolitionist (b. 1759)
 August 9 – Godfrey Higgins, English archaeologist (b. 1772)
 August 14 – Placidus a Spescha, Swiss mountain climber (b. 1752)
 September – James Farquhar, Scottish politician (b. 1764)
 September 7 – Hannah More, English religious writer, Romantic, and philanthropist (b. 1745)
 September 15 – Arthur Hallam, English poet (b. 1811)
 September 27 – Ram Mohan Roy, Hindu reformer (b. 1772)
 September 29 – King Ferdinand VII of Spain (b. 1784)
 October 3 – François, marquis de Chasseloup-Laubat, French general (b. 1754)
 October 4 – Maria Jane Jewsbury, English poet and literary reviewer (b. 1800)
 October 16
 Andrey Bolotov, Russian agriculturalist and memoirist (b. 1738)
 Meno Haas, German-born copperplate engraver (b. 1752)
 November 16 – John McMillan, Presbyterian minister, missionary in Pennsylvania (b. 1752)
 November 23 – Jean-Baptiste Jourdan, French marshal (b. 1762)
 December 17 – Kaspar Hauser, German youth of uncertain origin (stabbed) (b. 1812?)

References